"Hadashi no Megami" is the thirteenth single by B'z, released on June 2, 1993. This song is one of B'z many number-one singles in Oricon chart. The single was re-released in 2003, and re-entered at #11. It sold over 1,735,000 copies according to Oricon, becoming their 4th best selling single in Japan.

Track listing 
 - 4:27
Kara - Kara - 3:46

Certifications

References

External links
B'z official website

1993 singles
B'z songs
Oricon Weekly number-one singles
Songs written by Tak Matsumoto
Songs written by Koshi Inaba
1993 songs
BMG Japan singles